Carl von Moers (9 December 1871 – 26 May 1957) was a German horse rider, born in Neuwied, who competed in the 1912 Summer Olympics.

He and his horse May-Queen won the silver medal as member of the German team in the team eventing after finishing 15th in the individual eventing competition. Von Moers also participated in the individual dressage event with his horse New Bank. They finished twelfth.

References

External links
list of German equestrians 
Carl von Moers at Sports-Reference.com

1871 births
1957 deaths
People from Neuwied
German event riders
German dressage riders
Equestrians at the 1912 Summer Olympics
Olympic equestrians of Germany
German male equestrians
Olympic silver medalists for Germany
Olympic medalists in equestrian
Medalists at the 1912 Summer Olympics
Sportspeople from Rhineland-Palatinate